Polish census of 2002 was a census in Poland taken from 21 May to 8 June 2002.

Results
96% of surveyed declared Polish ethnicity; 1,23% other and 2,03% gave no answer.

Population by voivodeships
Source:

Significant ethnic minorities 

In addition to Poles, ethnic groups of more than 25,000 people compose the following:

See also
 Demographics of Poland

References

External links
  

2002
2002 in Poland
2002 censuses